The Nai Soi Community Learning Center (NSCLC) is a non-profit ecologically sustainable school for high school aged refugee children from Burma.  The NSCLC is located in the village of Nai Soi, in Mae Hong Son Province, Thailand. 

The students study both the English and Burmese languages, organic farming, and community development in order to prepare them to become leaders in assisting their communities recover from the 24-year-old military conflict in Burma that forced  their emigration.

The school needs financial support and more importantly people to volunteer to teach English, sustainable development and community development, or organic farming.  If the applicant is qualified he or she will receive free room and board at the school.  They must only pay for their own transportation to and from the school from their home country.

External links 
Ban Nai Soi Community Learning Center home page

Refugee aid organizations
Mae Hong Son province